Brachyelytrum is a genus of North American and East Asian plants in the grass family, classified in its own tribe Brachyelytreae.

Molecular phylogenetic study has indicated that Brachyelytrum is the earliest diverging lineage in the subfamily Pooideae (the cool season grasses), a lineage that includes many of the world's major cereal crops such as barley, wheat, and oats.

 Species
 Brachyelytrum aristosum (Michx.) Trel.  from Ontario to Newfoundland south through Great Lakes region + Appalachian Mountains
 Brachyelytrum erectum (Schreb.) P.Beauv - from Ontario to Newfoundland south to Texas + Florida
 Brachyelytrum japonicum (Hack.) Matsum. ex Honda - Anhui, Jiangsu, Jiangxi, Yunnan, Zhejiang, Japan, Jeju Island in South Korea

 formerly included
see  Aphanelytrum Muhlenbergia Pseudobromus

 Brachyelytrum africanum - Pseudobromus africanus
 Brachyelytrum pringlei - Muhlenbergia diversiglumis
 Brachyelytrum procumbens - Aphanelytrum procumbens 
 Brachyelytrum silvaticum - Pseudobromus africanus

See also
 List of Poaceae genera

References

External links
 

Pooideae
Grasses of Asia
Grasses of North America
Grasses of China
Grasses of the United States
Poaceae genera
Taxa named by Palisot de Beauvois